Murray Salem (January 12, 1950 in Cleveland, Ohio – January 6, 1998) from Brooklyn, Ohio was an American television actor and screenwriter.

He appeared in a number of television shows as an actor, including the miniseries Jesus of Nazareth as Simon the Zealot. He wrote the script for the 1990 Arnold Schwarzenegger film Kindergarten Cop.

Murray Salem died in Los Angeles, California on January 6, 1998 from AIDS complications, six days before his 48th birthday.

Filmography

References

External links 
 

1950 births
1998 deaths
American male television actors
American male screenwriters
AIDS-related deaths in California
Male actors from Cleveland
20th-century American male actors
People from Brooklyn, Ohio
Screenwriters from Ohio
20th-century American male writers
20th-century American screenwriters